Red Matter may refer to:

 Red Matter (video game), a 2018 sci-fi virtual reality game developed and published by Spanish studio Vertical Robot
 Red matter (Star Trek), a fictitious red liquid material introduced in the 2009 film Star Trek